was a town located on the island of Itsukushima in Saeki District, Hiroshima Prefecture, Japan.

As of 2019, the town had an estimated population of 1,564 and a density of 51.46 persons per km2. The total area was 30.39 km2.

On November 3, 2005, Miyajima, along with the town of Ōno (also from Saeki District), was merged into the expanded city of Hatsukaichi.

Merger with Hatsukaichi 
In August 2004, both Hatsukaichi and the city of Hiroshima expressed an interest in annexing the town. The people in Miyajima supported Hatsukaichi. A committee for discussing the merger was created as soon as possible and the town was amalgamated with the city of Hatsukaichi on November 3, 2005.

Dissolved municipalities of Hiroshima Prefecture
Hatsukaichi, Hiroshima